French Cookin' is an album by saxophonist Budd Johnson which was recorded in 1963 and released on the Argo label.

Track listing
 "La Petite Valse" (Duke Ellington, Phyllis Claire, Joe Heyne) – 3:06
 "Le Grisbi" (Jean Wiener, Marc Lanjean, Norman Gimbel) – 5:44
 "I Can Live with the Blues" (Budd Johnson) – 4:33
 "Darling, Je Vous Aime Beaucoup" (Anna Sosenko) – 4:38
 "Under Paris Skies" (Jean Dréjac, Kim Gannon, Hubert Giraud) – 4:25
 "Hugues Blues" (Johnson) – 3:50
 "Je Vous Aime" (Sam Coslow) – 5:00
 "Je T' Aime" (Harry Archer) – 4:20

Personnel
Budd Johnson – tenor saxophone
Hank Jones – piano
Kenny Burrell, Everett Barksdale – guitar
Milt Hinton – bass
Willie Rodriguez – latin percussion
Osie Johnson – drums
Joseph Venuto – marimba, vibraphone

References

Budd Johnson albums
1963 albums
Argo Records albums
Albums produced by Esmond Edwards
Albums recorded at Van Gelder Studio